Erin Louise Thompson is an Australian politician. She has been a Labor member of the South Australian House of Assembly since the 2022 state election, representing Davenport. She replaced the Liberal politician, Steve Murray, who had held the seat since 2018.

Prior to her preselection, Thompson had served as elected mayor of the City of Onkaparinga, taking leave of absence to campaign for Davenport.

References 

Living people
Year of birth missing (living people)
Members of the South Australian House of Assembly
Women mayors of places in South Australia
Women members of the South Australian House of Assembly
South Australian local councillors
21st-century Australian politicians
21st-century Australian women politicians